Taylorville Reservoir is located east of Belfort, New York. Fish species present in the lake are pickerel, white sucker, yellow perch and black bullhead. There is carry down access near the dam on the west shore off Taylorville Road. There is also carry down access at Double Eddy on the north shore.

References

Reservoirs in New York (state)
Lewis County, New York